Susuman Airport  is a minor airport built  south of Susuman in Magadan Oblast, Russia

History
It was built during World War II for the Alaska-Siberian (ALSIB) air route used to ferry American Lend-Lease aircraft to the Eastern Front.  The airport closed about 1998 and the control tower was converted to an Orthodox church and the airport's main building to a monastery.

The airport reopened in 2012 serving 4 flights a week to Magadan's Sokol Airport.

Airlines and Destinations

References

Airports built in the Soviet Union
Airports in Magadan Oblast